Darfo Boario Terme is a comune in the province of Brescia, in Lombardy, northern Italy. The name combines Darfo, the capoluogo, with Boario Terme, the largest frazione.
 
It is bounded by the communes of Angolo Terme, Artogne, Esine, Gianico, Piancogno, Rogno.
The small lake Lago Moro is located in the commune.

Geography

Territory 
Around the centre, i.e. Darfo, Boario Terme, Corna and Montecchio, the following areas develop in a radial pattern: Erbanno, Gorzone, Sciano, Angone, Fucine, Pellalepre, Bessimo Superiore and Capo di Largo. The four most important quarters of the town (Darfo, Boario Terme, Corna and Montecchio) are closely integrated to form a sort of quadrilateral, the centre of which is the "Isola" area, a name derived from the fact that it lies at a bend in the River Oglio.

Area 
The urban area has a surface area of 36,200 square kilometers, and from an altimetrical point of view, the difference in height is considerable: from the lowest point of Bessimo Superiore (206 m) to the highest point of Dosso Sparviero (1895 m).

Mountainous reliefs 
The most important reliefs of the municipal government are: Monte Erbanno (1664 metres) and Altissimo (1704 metres) to the north-west, Dosso Blussega (1810 metres) and Dosso Sparviero to the south-west (1895 metres). The area has rock formations in Montecchio and Corna, and gravel and sand along the bed of the River Oglio. The Monticoli (deriving from the late Latin monticŭlus, diminutive of mons : montis, meaning 'mountain') are considered to be fundamental to the town of Darfo Boario Terme, in fact they have repeatedly protected the Piana Boario from the flooding of the River Oglio and their maximum height is 394 metres.

Pietra Simona 
The rock outcropping that forms the characteristic Monticoli is made up of red sandstone, also known as 'Pietra Simona, from the area of Simoni in Gorzone, where it has been quarried since ancient times. Simona stone is the basic and characteristic element of the nature and landscape of the Bassa Valcamonica (in particular of Darfo Boario Terme), and because of its natural availability, is the basis of rock art. Simona stone is a contact metamorphism sandstone; it has a uniform stratification plane and a fracture plane of 45 degrees. It has the negative solubility of cement, porosity, permeability and chemical resistance. It is a kind of elastic rock and has considerable resistance to processing. Its specific gravity is calculated at 33 quintals per cubic metre and, when smooth, it has a textured matte sheen. The characteristic that makes it immediately recognisable is its consistently purplish-red colour. The versatility of this sandstone withstood competition from marble in the Middle Ages. Marcello Ricardi wrote in Article 1 of the magazine 'L'Ogliolo', 'Owning the portal of the Simona stone house means that a family can be seen in Vicinie, either for personal wealth or political influence. In many villages in the Camonica Valley these structures are still intact, and the date of the inauguration is often engraved...'.

 Hydrography 
Beneath the historic centre of Erbanno there is a river floodplain, today houses and industry are everywhere, but until a few decades ago it was a cultivated area. Thousands of years ago this plain was the site of a lake basin, which extended from today's Lake Iseo to Cividate Camuno. This is due not only to the nature of the subsoil, but also to the presence of evident fishing tools, such as simple nets and cages, in the rock carvings of the area. The territory of the municipality of Darfo Boario Terme includes, in addition to the river Oglio, the streams Dezzo, Rovinazza, Budrio, Re, Ogliolo and the Italsider hydroelectric power stations. Since ancient times, rivers and streams have been seriously damaged by floods. We need only recall the extremely serious disaster caused by the collapse of the Gleno dam (1 December 1923) and the flood of 16 September 1960.

 Origins of the name 
According to Olivieri, the name is a compound word 'ad arvum', meaning 'present'. According to Mario Gallotti, it derives from the Mediterranean word arbe', which is the name of the Alpine river. Some scholars believe it originated from the German "Dorf" (village). Don Lino Ertani has suggested that Darfo derives from the ancient dialect word "Garf" (landslide, gravel and rock). The dialect pronunciation is actually "Darf" and would indicate the rising of the terrain of ancient Darfo and the descent of the cones of the Rovinazza and Re streams, which brought numerous boulders and debris downstream.

Sights

Terme di Boario

History 
Antonio Bazzini, as he wrote in "Cronaca di Lovere", claimed that the history of Boario Terme as an excellent health resort began when the Casino di Boario was built, where "salutary magnesic and iron vitrinolate waters" were managed.

According to some scholars, however, knowledge of the waters of Boario dates back to the 15th century and led some doctors to study their therapeutic effects. It seems that the famous doctor and naturalist Paracelsus (1493-1541) also visited the area. In 1700, when the physician Francesco Roncalli Parolino wrote in his paper 'De acquis brixianis', in 1724 to be precise, a remarkable revival took place. Roncalli himself reiterated the effectiveness of the "aquae bogiarianae" in "Europae Medicina" (1747).

In the 19th century, Ottavio Ferrario (1840) conducted new research and the first chemical analyses. Alessandro Manzoni wrote to Giovanni Morelli (Giovanni Morelli), a doctor from Bergamo, on 16 December 1845: "I have reason to regret not having taken advantage of the kind and cordial exhibition you gave me to obtain Boario's water directly from the owner of the land".

In 1857, dr. Biffi, the first medical scientist of the Austrian lieutenant in Lombardy described it as "the most active in Lombardy". However, according to Cantù, the revaluation of the waters of Boario came about thanks to doctor Zattini of Darfo in 1858. Since then, more and more people have been coming to Boario to treat themselves, but staying in nearby villages such as Darfo, Corna, Esine, etc. Only in 1906 the waters of Boario were revalued. Since then, the first spa building with features such as an Art Nouveau dome was built and, in 1906, the Hotel Terme was also built, followed by the construction of other hotels.

However, it was not until 1914, with the construction of a thermal spa, that the therapeutic value of the waters was scientifically and methodically developed. As a result of this development, Royal Decree No. 765 of 15 April 1926 elevated Boario to the status of Autonomous Board of Health.

Between 1951 and 1952, a new spring was discovered, now called Fausta, in honour of its discoverer Dr Fausto Cardio.

A few years later, with the extension of the park, the spa was completely transformed and a new pavilion and a huge auditorium were added.

This small spa also survived the terrible flood that hit Boario on the night of 17 September 1960.

In 1964, a new spa named after Alessandro Manzoni was opened. In 1965 the old spa establishment, dedicated to Adolfo Ferrata, was enlarged and modernised. New and modern hotels and guesthouses increased the accommodation capacity of Boario Terme.

The thermal spring is located in a vast park, in the middle of shady avenues, vast lawns and flowerbeds, dominated by the steep rocky walls of Monte Erbanno.

After three centuries of renowned therapeutic and curative value, the Boario spa still retains a quality of high excellence, as certified by CerAm, the European Mineral Water Research Centre in 2010.

The Dome 
The Liberty dome, the emblem of Terme di Boario, is made of white marble, and the balcony is supported by pillars with Ionic capitals. Its history can be traced back to 1913: it was once the seat of the orchestra, while today it is considered a sign and symbol of the Terme di Boario and the municipality in which it is located, Darfo Boario Terme. The dome is the most prestigious symbol of the Padiglione dell'Antica Fonte, and was built a century ago by the architect Amerigo Marazzi, becoming a striking example of Art Nouveau architecture.

Park 
Also important for well-being is the centuries-old park, comprising 130,000 square metres of land where mineral water is collected. It is the ideal place to take a relaxing walk and invigorate the spirit.

Springs 
The precious quality of the thermal waters have their natural foundations in the Alps surrounding the Camonica Valley. In fact, by coming into contact with precious mineral elements, the waters are purified and enriched thanks to them. The waters are sulphate, bicarbonate, calcium and magnesium cold (13-15 °C). The four springs of the Terme di Boario are differentiated by the concentration of salts, a characteristic that allows them to have different therapeutic functions such as treatment, rehabilitation and prevention. They mainly play a beneficial role for all physical ailments caused by the stress of everyday life.

As mentioned above, there are four springs:

 Acqua Antica Fonte, indicated mainly for those suffering from digestive disorders, cholecystopathy and irritable bowel or with problems of constipation and diverticulosis. This water contains a high percentage of sulphate, bicarbonate and calcium and, if drunk warm, increases its effectiveness; 
 Acqua Fausta, with its mineral elements inside, helps to cleanse the mucous membrane and promotes better intestinal motility. This water is suitable for those who suffer from intestinal disorders, in particular bile flow difficulties, chronic constipation, abdominal bloating and irritable bowel;
 Acqua Igea, is able to act on the digestive system and biliary tract, promote the elimination of metabolic waste products and activate water exchange. It has beneficial effects on digestion and prevention of kidney stones, and has anti-inflammatory effects on the genito-urinary tract;
 Acqua Boario, due to its low sodium content, has a strong purifying and detoxifying effect on the digestive system and urinary tract, aiding digestion and finding specific indications in the treatment of cystitis, kidney stones and water retention. Thanks to its balanced calcium and magnesium content, it is considered the best water to drink every day at any age.

References

 

Spa towns in Italy